Lepidochrysops rhodesensae is a butterfly in the family Lycaenidae. It is found in eastern Zambia.

Adults have been recorded on wing in November.

References

Butterflies described in 1923
Lepidochrysops
Endemic fauna of Zambia
Butterflies of Africa